The 2021–22 St. John's Red Storm women's basketball team represent St. John's University during the 2021–22 NCAA Division I women's basketball season. The Red Storm, led by tenth-year head coach Joe Tartamella, play their games at Carnesecca Arena and are members of the Big East Conference.

Roster

References

St. John's
St. John's Red Storm women's basketball seasons
Saint John's
Saint John's